is the ninth episode of the Japanese anime television series Neon Genesis Evangelion, which was created by Gainax. The episode, written by Hideaki Anno and Akio Satsukawa and directed by Seiji Mizushima, was first broadcast on TV Tokyo on November 29, 1995. The series is set fifteen years after a worldwide cataclysm and is mostly set in the futuristic, fortified city Tokyo-3. The series' protagonist is Shinji Ikari, a teenage boy who is recruited by his father Gendo to the organization Nerv to pilot a gigantic, bio-mechanical mecha named Evangelion into combat with beings called Angels. The episode  follows two Nerv mecha pilots, Asuka Langley Soryu and Shinji, who must defeat an Angel capable of splitting into two individuals, Israfel.

Anno conceived the episode to lighten the tone of the series after the previous episodes, which were characterized by an introspective, psychological mood. Shinji Higuchi, who worked with Anno on Nadia: The Secret of Blue Water and is known for his work's humor, drew the storyboards, giving the story a comedic tone. The installment contains cultural references to history, religion, films, series and previous works by the Gainax studio.

The episode's first broadcast scored a 7.1% audience share on Japanese television, and was well-received by audiences and critics. Reviewers appreciated the episode's humor, music score and action, ranking it as one of the best episodes in the series. Particularly positive was the reception given to the second and final clash of the installment, featuring the two mecha Evangelion 01 and 02 synchronized to music, which is also considered one of the best in the anime.

Plot
Asuka Langley Soryu, the pilot of the mecha Evangelion Unit-02 who has recently arrived in Japan from Germany, moves in with Misato Katsuragi, commander of the special agency Nerv, and starts living with Shinji Ikari, pilot of the Eva-01. She and Shinji intercept the seventh in a series of mankind's enemies called Angels, Israfel, along Suruga Bay. Asuka, eager to show off her skills, strikes the enemy by slashing it with her Sonic Glaive; shortly afterward, however, Israfel splits into two small individuals, who defeat the two pilots and are temporarily stopped by the United Nations forces.

While waiting for the enemy to resume its advance, Asuka and Shinji, under Misato's guidance, try to train themselves by synchronizing all their actions. After several days and nights spent acting in harmony in all the motions of daily life, Shinji and Asuka sleep alone at Misato's house, and Asuka urges Shinji not to enter her room. That night Asuka herself apparently sleepwalks into Shinji's room and lies down next to him. Shinji tries to kiss her, but stops himself when she starts calling out for her mother in her sleep. Meanwhile, Misato finds herself in a lift with her former lover, Ryoji Kaji, who kisses her. During the second clash against Israfel, Asuka and Shinji, aboard their Evangelions, perfectly synchronize their movements to a musical base and within a minute manage to defeat the enemy.

Production

Neon Genesis Evangelion first six episodes left the staff drained and feeling weighed down by the show's heavy mood; Hideaki Anno, director of the series, consequently decided to lighten the show's tone in the following episodes. Anno then inserted Asuka to lighten the installments, introducing her as a sunny, extroverted girl, but without thinking to re-evaluate her character much as in the final episodes of the series and without foreshadowing. Particularly important was the contribution of Shinji Higuchi, who had already worked on Nadia: The Secret of Blue Water and was known for the humorous character of his works. Higuchi infused the episode with an adolescent and comic tone, similar to his previous works.

Gainax studio decided on the basic plot for "Both of You, Dance Like You Want to Win!" in 1993, when it published a presentation document of Neon Genesis Evangelion titled , which describes "the Eva's first beside-water battle". Akio Satsukawa and Anno co-wrote the script for the episode, whose storyboards were edited by Higuchi. Seiji Mizushima was chosen as director, Shinya Hasegawa worked as a chief animator, and Mahiro Maeda and Mitsumu Wogi as assistant character designers.

Hasegawa took care of the scene in which Shinji tries to kiss Asuka, while Ogura Nobutoshi draws the scene of Shinji and Asuka's final phone call. The first battle between the Evangelions and Israfel was done by Fumitomo Kizaki. Masayuki took care of Asuka and Shinji's six days of preparation; Keisuke Watabe served as the person in charge of the first half of the final battle, while Yutaka Nakamura worked on the second half. Hasegawa also personally recruited new members to add to the animation staff, including artists not usually associated with Gainax works. The result, similar to Yoshinori Kanada's animations, such as perspective kicks and playful drawings, stood apart from the other Neon Genesis Evangelion episodes.

Compared to the other episodes, "Both of You, Dance Like You Want to Win!" is distinguished by the abundant use of special animation techniques such as residual images and kinetic deformations. For this purpose, the characters' faces were deformed to unreal expressions, exaggerating movements and caricatures. For the scene in which Misato screams with glasses in her hands, the staff used a wide-angle lens; this was not indicated in the script, as it was chosen later by the direction. For the final synchronized battle, the Evas' coordination is technically replicated by a montage consisting of hand-drawn and digitally composited graphics by means of which both the two Evas' and their pilots' bodies appear to merge into one single entity; the images were obtained by cutting the images of Asuka and Shinji with their respective Evangelions along the vertical central axis, combining them into one. Takehito Koyasu, Tomokazu Seki, Tetsuya Iwanaga, Hiro Yūki and Koichi Yamadera, voice actors of several main characters in the series, played unidentified characters for "Both of You, Dance Like You Want to Win!". In some sequences of the installment, the staff also used the songs "You Are My Only One", "Aoi Legend" and "Toi sora no yakusoku" by Kotono Mitsuishi, Misato Katsuragi's voice actress, from the image album Lilia 〜 from Ys, while Yoko Takahashi sang the final theme song for the episode, entitled "Acid Bossa Version", a rendition of "Fly Me to the Moon" with a bossa nova and acid house sound.

Cultural references and themes

"Both of You, Dance Like You Want to Win!" contains references to films, historical concepts, or previous works by Hideaki Anno. Asuka, for example, awkwardly quotes an existing Confucian proverb from the Book of Rites, while the training between her and Shinji has been compared to the game of twister. During the episode, Asuka takes refuge in Misato's room to avoid sleeping alone in the same room with Shinji. The sliding door separating them is renamed by her the "unshakable walls of Jericho". This nickname refers to the battle of Jericho, a biblical episode narrated in the book of Joshua, and the movie It Happened One Night (1934). In one of the most famous scenes in the film, the two main characters spend a night in the same motel room, using a blanket as a divider between their beds, called by the characters themselves "walls of Jericho". In another scene, "Blood Type: Blue" is glimpsed on Ritsuko's PC, in reference to the Japanese title of Blue Christmas (1978).

The final battle of the episode has been compared to tokusatsu shows. Yuichiro Oguro, editor of extra materials contained in the Evangelion Japanese home video releases, compared the battle of the two Evangelions without external power with Ultraman, the protagonist of the Ultraman franchise who could only fight for a few minutes of activity; he and Gualtiero Cannarsi, responsible of the first Italian Evangelion localisation, also noted how in one sequence the body of the Angel defeated in the sixth episode, Ramiel, is visible. Oguro therefore described this episode as a more realistic version of the tokusatsu of his childhood. The cut in which the legs of the Evangelions are seen toppled under the ground has been described as an homage to Kon Ichikawa's The Inugami Family (1976) and Shinji Sōmai's Typhoon Club (1985). Even the typefaces used in the titles of this and other episodes of the series, characterized by an unconventional sense of reading, have been interpreted as an homage to the style of Ichikawa.

Writer Dennis Redmond described "Both of You, Dance Like You Want to Win!" as the Evangelion's most explicit comic parody of the mecha genre; he also noted that the final battle references "the shot techniques of the televised sports event and Olympic gymnastics routine". Jacob Parker-Dalton, a writer for the website Otaquest, mentioned the installment as an example of the influence of Space Battleship Yamato, Ultraman, and Mobile Suit Gundam on Anno. Other references are to earlier Gainax works. In one scene Ritsuko wears glasses similar to Electra's character from Nadia: The Secret of Blue Water, while the holograms with which Asuka and Shinji communicate, used unrealistically during conversations, have been compared to those in Gunbuster. During the first confrontation against Israfel, a building with the sign "Studio Fantasia", a name listed as an associate producer on the staff of Gainax's Otaku no video, appears.

The episode focuses on several themes in the series, such as the value of masculinity or the analysis of interpersonal relationships. Cannarsi noted how the script analogizes the couples of Shinji and Asuka and that of Misato and Kaji, who both during "Both of You" have kissing scenes; the former, which an official pamphlet of the series compared to the island arch of Nadia: The Secret of Blue Water, is characterized by adolescent tones, awkwardness, and uncertainty, while Misato and Kaji's has a much more adult sensuality. Moreover, the encyclopedia magazine Evangelion Chronicle noted how Asuka's personality is emphasized as she steps on love letters addressed to her and looks at Rei by positioning herself on an elevated plane; female protagonists with loud and selfish personalities were not common in television anime at the time, but gained popularity following Evangelion. Asuka flaunts her strength, but she is beaten in combat by Israfel, and in training with Shinji she is initially unsuccessful. Newtype magazine noted that she also cries in bed with Shinji, saying the word 'Mama' in her sleep. The episode therefore also depicts the girl's inner fragility, hidden by her aggressive and seemingly strong facade. Cannarsi also noted how in "Both of You, Dance Like You Want to Win!" Asuka scorns and questions Shinji's value, especially as a man, with barbs like "Are you stupid?" or "You're a man, aren't you?". Her behavior has been likened to a latent inferiority complex toward the male sex or a masculine protest.

Reception
"Both of You, Dance Like You Want to Win!" was first broadcast on November 29, 1995, and drew a 7.1% audience share on Japanese television. In 1996 it ranked second in Animage Anime Grand Prix poll of "Best Anime Episodes" with 567 votes. In July 2020, Comic Book Resources reported an 8.2/10 rating on IMDb for the installment, ranking it tenth among the highest-rated Evangelion episodes. Official merchandise based on the episode has also been released, including T-shirts and action figures.

The episode was well received by critics, who praised the director, the humour, the action and the music of the installment, and some reviewers ranked it among the best episodes of Neon Genesis Evangelion. Screen Rant, for example, listed the battle against Israfel among the best fights in the series. Film School Rejects's Max Covill ranked it second among the best episodes of the series; according to Covill, the installment doesn’t move the plot forward in any particularly exciting way, but praised it for having the "most hilarious moments of the series" and the "excellent combat sequence". He also lauded the scene in which Asuka and Shinji blame each other for the first defeat and the one in which they try to synchronize for the final battle. The Anime Café's Akio Nagatomi praised the performance of the voice actors, the humour and the late fight. Writer Dennis Dedmond similarly praised Anno's scriptwriting, the near-kiss scene between Asuka and Shinji and the "gorgeously choreographed" final battle. KKBox's Tomoyuki Mori described the namesake soundtrack, used during the battle, as "one of the most famous Evangelion songs"; according to Mori, it combines "lightness, sadness and strength".

Other reviewers on Comic Book Resources criticized certain aspects of the characterization of the protagonists. Theo Kogod criticized Asuka's behavior, as well as Misato's decision to let her and Shinji live in her apartment. Andrew Tefft similarly took a negative view of Asuka for her authoritarian attitude in the first battle and for blaming Shinji during the synchronized training. Conversely, Kristy Anderson, writing for Supanova Expo website, mentioned the training among the best moments of Shinji's character, while SyFy Wire's Daniel Dockery described the final fight as a "beautiful display of action choreography".

Writer Dani Cavallaro saw in the second episode of FLCL, a series produced by Gainax and directed by Tsurumaki, an allusion to Israfel and the battles of Evangelion. Furthermore, according to Gualtiero Cannarsi, the synchronized combat of Asuka and Shinji was virtually reproduced in the video game Rival Schools: United by Fate.

References

Citations

Bibliography

External links
 

1995 Japanese television episodes
Neon Genesis Evangelion episodes
Science fiction television episodes